Mobile Civic Center (formerly Mobile Municipal Auditorium) is a multi-purpose facility located in Mobile, Alabama. Owned by the City of Mobile and operated by ASM Global, the facility consists of three venues: a theater, an expo hall, and an arena. It is suitable for large indoor events including sporting events and trade shows. The theater seats for 1,938, while the expo hall can seat 3,000. The largest venue of the Mobile Civic Center is the arena, which can seat 10,112.

The Civic Center started redevelopment in March 2018.

Background
The structure opened as the Mobile Municipal Auditorium on July 9, 1964. It celebrated its opening with a "Holiday on Ice" ice skating show. It was built with the city's longtime Mardi Gras celebrations in mind. The concourse area is often used for balls during Mardi Gras. The building's "entertainment profile increased significantly" during the 1970s, hosting dozens of popular acts, including Elvis Presley, Chicago, Led Zeppelin, Michael Jackson, the Rolling Stones, KISS, and Fleetwood Mac. It did not earn revenue however, and it stopped regularly booking big-name acts in the mid-1980s.

Irregularities in the Civic Center's finances were spearheaded by finance director and former Mobile mayor Gary Greenough, who was convicted for multimillion-dollar fraud in 1985. The preceding year, the Civic Center posted losses of $435,000. The fraud charges, plus competition from other Gulf Coast auditoriums (in Biloxi and Pensacola) and the city's open Convention Center caused the complex to go into a decline.

In recent years, the complex has been called "aging and deteriorating." By the early 2010s, the center ran a deficit $600,000–$800,000 per year. For many years, the auditorium has been used for the Mobile Opera, Mobile Ballet, Distinguished Young Women, Mobile International Festival, and high school graduation ceremonies. Top touring acts regularly skip the complex and it has been without a regular tenant since the departure of the Mobile Mysticks hockey team in 2002.

On January 29, 2015, Mobile Mayor Sandy Stimpson issued a statement announcing that the Civic Center will close in April 2016 for redevelopment. City officials were then in search of a public-private partnership to help fund the efforts. 11 months later, Stimpson delayed the closing by two years, needing more time to find a private partner interested in redevelopment.

The Theater 
The 1,940-seat theater is used for concerts, Broadway shows, and other theatrical events. The Theater is connected to the Arena by a glass promenade. The theater is known for its acoustics, unobstructed views, and backstage facilities. It contains a 90 by 60 foot (27 by 18 m) stage.

Expo Hall 
With 28,000 square feet (2600 m²) of space, the Expo Hall can be used for conventions, trade shows, sporting events, banquets, and even concerts as well as other events. It seats 2,200 for seating events and up to 3,000 for concerts. It has a 40 by 32 foot (12 by 28 m) portable stage and a dance floor that can accommodate 1,500.

The Arena 
The tallest building in the complex at seven stories tall, the Civic Center Arena (previously known as the Municipal Auditorium) features a domed roof. It features 80,000 square feet (7400 m) of space for sporting events and trade shows. There are 6,120 permanent seats at the arena, which for sporting events and concerts seats up to 10,112. The arena's main floor is encircled by 15 meeting rooms. There are eight concession stands, plus three locker rooms. In addition to trade shows, concerts, and sporting events, ice shows, circuses, wrestling, conventions and banquets can be held at the arena. The arena hosted the Mobile Mysticks of the East Coast Hockey League, WCW Beach Blast (1992), and Uncensored (1998), as well as hosting the Mobile Seagulls of the National Indoor Football League and Mobile Wizards of the af2. It also was the site of the 1991 Sun Belt Conference men's basketball tournament. The Mobile Revelers played at the venue from 2001 to 2003 until the team folded citing low attendance.

Mobile Civic Center Arena is still in use, and continues to serve as the Mobile stop of World Wrestling Entertainment, Ringling Brothers and Barnum and Bailey Circus, Disney on Ice and Champions on Ice.

Seating capacities are: Hockey, 8,030; Basketball, 8,000; End-stage concerts, 8,119-9,920; Center-stage concerts, boxing and wrestling, 10,000.

Notable concerts 

The Monkees performed here on August 12, 1967 as part of their 1967 US tour.
Elvis Presley performed at Municipal Auditorium on six occasions (14 September 1970, 20 June 1973, 2 June 1975 (two shows) and 2 June 1977).
The Jacksons performed at Municipal Auditorium on July 18, 1981 during their Triumph Tour.
Tina Turner performed here on November 21, 1987 during her Break Every Rule Tour.
Led Zeppelin performed at Municipal Auditorium on May 13, 1973.
Guns N' Roses performed at Municipal Auditorium on November 3, 1987 as part of the Appetite for Destruction Tour.
The Eagles performed at Civic Center during the "Hell Freezes Over" tour May 12, 1995
Elton John performed at the Civic Center during his Wonderful Crazy Night Tour on March 15, 2016.

References

External links
 

1964 establishments in Alabama
Basketball venues in Alabama
Buildings and structures in Mobile, Alabama
Concert halls in the United States
Defunct NBA G League venues
Indoor ice hockey venues in Alabama
Indoor arenas in Alabama
Mobile Revelers
Sports venues in Mobile, Alabama
Sports venues completed in 1964